Amydria effrentella is a moth of the family Acrolophidae. It is found in North America, including Alabama, Arizona, Arkansas, California, Georgia, Illinois, Indiana, Kentucky, Maryland, Massachusetts, Minnesota, Mississippi, Nevada, New Brunswick, New Jersey, New York, North Carolina, Ohio, Quebec, Saskatchewan, South Carolina, Tennessee, Utah, West Virginia and  Wisconsin.

The wingspan is about 24 mm. The forewings are mottled and there is a dark patch at the end of the discal cell.

The larvae are probably subsoil root feeders or detritivores.

References

Moths described in 1859
Acrolophidae